The Surface Laptop is a line of laptops marketed by Microsoft, as a sub-brand of their Surface devices. Several models have been produced:
 Surface Laptop (1st generation), released in 2017
 Surface Laptop 2, released in 2018
 Surface Laptop 3, released in 2019
 Surface Laptop 4, released in 2021
 Surface Laptop 5, released in 2022
 Surface Laptop Go, marketed as an affordable version of the Surface Laptop, released in 2020
 Surface Laptop Studio, a 2-in-1 version of the Surface Laptop, released in 2021
Surface Laptop SE, an education-oriented version of the Surface Laptop, shipping with Windows 11 SE, released in 2021